Aburni was a king of Nobatia, who ruled around 450 AD as the successor of Silko.

Aburni is known from a letter that was found at Qasr Ibrim. The letter was written in bad Greek directed by the king of the Blemmyes, Phonen, and his son, the phylarch Breytek, to Aburni Nakase and his sons, and Mouses. This is the answer to a lost letter.

The letter makes clear-speakers, that he is the enemy and called Nobatäer various conflicts he had with his successor and Silko Aburni. Reported speaking of animals, which were exchanged for land on which Silko killed blemmyrischen phylarch Yeny and have kidnapped numerous priests. It remains unclear whether Phonen got back his land. Speaking, however, testified the last ruler of the Blemmyrer and one may suspect that succeeded Aburni to destroy them and take over their kingdom.

Literature

Kings of Kush